Robert Lee O'Brien (January 26, 1927 – September 19, 2008) was an American professional basketball player. He played in the Basketball Association of America for the Philadelphia Warriors and St. Louis Bombers. O'Brien also played in the American Basketball League and Professional Basketball League of America.

BAA career statistics

Regular season

Playoffs

References

External links

1927 births
2008 deaths
American Basketball League (1925–1955) players
American men's basketball players
Basketball players from Kansas City, Missouri
Forwards (basketball)
Pepperdine Waves men's basketball players
Philadelphia Warriors players
Pottsville Packers players
Professional Basketball League of America players
St. Louis Bombers (NBA) players